One World Trade Center is a building in New York City.

One World Trade Center may also refer to:
One World Trade Center (Long Beach), in Long Beach, California
World Trade Center (Portland), in Portland, Oregon